Tobias Emanuel Petersen (born October 27, 1978) is an American former professional ice hockey right winger who formerly played for the Dallas Stars of the National Hockey League (NHL). He attended Colorado College, and was drafted by the Pittsburgh Penguins 244th overall in the 9th round of the 1998 NHL Entry Draft.

Playing career
During Game 3 of the Western Conference Final in the 2005–06 playoffs, Petersen scored his first ever NHL playoff goal against Ilya Bryzgalov of the Anaheim Ducks by stealing the puck and wrapping it into an empty net while Bryzgalov attempted to make a play behind his goal line.

In 2008 Petersen had a memorable experience at the AHL All-Star Game. The experience began the day before the game when Petersen won the 2008 AHL Skills Competition's fastest skater event with a 14.001 second lap.
The experience continued during the game as Petersen recorded 3 points including scoring on the first ever penalty shot in an AHL All-Star Game.

In the 2013–14 season, his seventh within the Stars organization, Petersen helped the Texas Stars to claim their first Calder Cup and immediately announced his retirement from professional hockey.

Personal life
Petersen and his wife Alexa have 2 sons, Bjorn (born August 2006) and Elliott (born October 2008).

Petersen has stated that he is a type-one diabetic. As a result, he must use his insulin pump during games. The Wilkes-Barre/Scranton Penguins nominated him as their 2003–2004 AHL Man of the Year candidate for his work with Diabetes charities. He later received the award in 2013.

Career statistics

Regular season and playoffs

International

Awards and honours

References

External links

1978 births
Living people
American men's ice hockey right wingers
Colorado College Tigers men's ice hockey players
Dallas Stars players
Edmonton Oilers players
Edmonton Road Runners players
Ice hockey people from Minneapolis
Sportspeople from Bloomington, Minnesota
Iowa Stars players
People with type 1 diabetes
Pittsburgh Penguins draft picks
Pittsburgh Penguins players
Texas Stars players
Wilkes-Barre/Scranton Penguins players